The assassination of Antonio Halili, the former Mayor of Tanauan, Batangas, in the Philippines, occurred on July 2, 2018 during a flag raising ceremony at the city hall. He was killed by an unidentified shooter who was never apprehended or publicly named, though authorities have said at least three people were involved in the assassination. Halili was the second Tanauan mayor assassinated, the first being Cesar Platon, who was assassinated in April 2001.

Background
The victim of the assassination, Antonio Halili was the mayor of Tanauan, a city in the northeast of Batangas province. In 2016, he garnered wide public attention for his "Walk of Shame" campaign which involved publicly parading drug suspects, who were made to wear cardboard signs that read "I'm a pusher, don't emulate me." The act raised concerns from human rights officials. Halili publicly supported President Rodrigo Duterte's national campaign against illegal drugs, but believed that drug kingpins should be the main target of the police operations.

Allegedly, Halili himself was involved in the illegal drug trade according to police. The politician strongly denied the claim, and said that he would resign and have himself publicly paraded as a drug suspect if the police were able to come up with evidence to support the allegation. The Mayor was stripped of supervisory powers over the local police in October 2017 due to the proliferation of illegal drugs in his city.

Assassination
The assassination of Tanauan Mayor Antonio Halili took place on July 2, 2018 at the Tanauan City Hall. Halili was attending a flag raising ceremony together with around 300 government employees and newly elected barangay officials before he was killed. Then-Tanauan Vice Mayor Jhoanna Villamor, who was pregnant at that time, was standing beside Halili at that time.

The killing took place during the singing of the national anthem. A single gunshot was heard disrupting the flag raising ceremony. The incident was inadvertently recorded on the video in different angles. The bullet pierced into Halili's left chest.

Halili was rushed to the CP Reyes Hospital, but was declared dead at 8:45 a.m., less than an hour after he was shot.

Investigation

Philippine National Police Chief Oscar Albayalde ordered the creation of a special investigation task group with Calabarzon regional director Edward Carranza acting on the order.

Suspects
The police has identified two "persons of interest" who are suspected of playing a role in Halili's killing. A third suspect was also in the process of identification. All of these people are said to be involved in the illegal drug trade. The gunman who killed Halili is suspected to be working with accomplices.

On August 22, CCTV footages were revealed showing a white car owned by a suspected gunman parks near the gasoline station – about 1 kilometer away from the incident – dated July 2. A man emerges from the car wearing a black T-shirt and green cap, and, not less than ten minutes later, returns to the car and drives away. Another showing the car driving back-and-forth at the memorial park near the City Hall where the incident took place. Soon after the incident, another CCTV showed the same car driving the expressway; it was revealed that the plate number of the car was changed, suspected that it is the getaway vehicle, and, according to the police, the plate number seen in the gas station was actually not issued by the Land Transportation Franchising and Regulatory Board (LTFRB). The man is yet to be identified by the police.

Possible motive
The police is considering the motive of the assassination to be related to the illegal drug trade, due to the identities of their designated "persons of interest" although they are not ruling out political motives for the killing. According to Philippine National Police Chief Oscar Albayalde, the police are also looking into a land dispute and a feud with a former high-ranking general in relation to the motive of the crime.

Circumstances of the killing
The police held a reenactment of the crime on July 5, 2018. A spent shell of a  bullet was found by the police on an empty lot where the unidentified gunman positioned himself for the hit. The police has not ascertained that the bullet came from the gunman's weapon. The weapon is concluded not to be a sniper, since the gunman decided to hit Halili in the chest and was viewed as not "confident" enough to aim for the mayor's head.

It was initially reported that the distance between the gunman and Halili was  but was later established by the police to be just . The gunman was also concluded to have positioned himself on a higher elevation than the ground the mayor was standing.

Aftermath 
On April 3, 2019, at least 19 armed men disguised as police abducted two of Halili's aides, Allan Fajardo and Ricky Atienza, at the hotel in Santa Rosa, Laguna. The authorities said that they did not conduct any operation against Fajardo, who is a top aide of Halili. The suspects escaped using a white van with no license plate.

See also
List of unsolved murders

References

2018 murders in the Philippines
Assassinations in the Philippines
Filmed assassinations
July 2018 crimes in Asia
Philippine Drug War
Unsolved murders in the Philippines